Peer Lisdorf (born 31 March 1967) is a former Danish association footballer and coach who played as a left midfielder, right midfielder, and a centre-forward. He played professionally for first-tier football team Brøndby IF and participated in both the UEFA Europa League and UEFA Champions League. Having played for Brøndby IF, he later became the assistant manager of the team in 2012, and also the coach for the Brøndby IF women's team and other teams in the Elitedivisionen, Denmark's highest-league football league for women. His last position in the sporting industry was as the head coach of HB Køge's women's team; after this, Lisdorf claimed that he would retire.

Club career
Lisdorf was born in Germany and started his footballing career in Denmark's Brøndby IF's youth team. From his position as a midfielder, Peer moved onto the professional team, Brøndby IF, in the highest Danish league. Peer was a young talent, scoring the first goal in his debut, and was awarded a sponsorship car before he could even legally drive. For each debut Peer made throughout his career, the team he was in either won or drew. In addition, every game played by Lisdorf in the UEFA Champions League, in which he was mostly in the starting eleven, resulted in a win or a draw.

Management career
After retiring from playing association football in 2001, Peer trained to become a coach and was granted a UEFA Pro Licence. He became the assistant manager of Brøndby IF under the head coach, Aurelijus Skarbalius, until 2013. Peer Lisdorf also became head coach of the Brøndby IF's women's team, in Denmark's highest-league football division, Elitedivisionen. Under Lisdorf's management, the team enjoyed huge success, winning the league four times. Lisdorf later moved on to manage Ballerup-Skovlunde Fodbold, and after this, became the coach for HB Køge's women's team (HB Køge Kvindeelite). Even though it was HB Køge Kvindeelite's first time in the Elitedivisionen, Lisdorf led them to win the title (the first in their entire history), and even led them to the Champions League qualification. After winning the Danish championship, the team ran off the pitch, picked up Lisdorf and carried him onto the pitch, bringing him multiple beers and chanting his name.

Outside football
Peer has two younger brothers, Bjørn and Jens, who are twins. His younger brother, Bjørn, also played professional football for some time, and is now a live streamer and an associate of Ice Poseidon. Peer has been known to occasionally appear on Bjørn's livestreams.

References

Danish football managers
Danish men's footballers
1967 births
Living people
Association football midfielders
Brøndby IF players
Brøndby IF managers
Ballerup-Skovlunde Fodbold managers
Brøndby IF non-playing staff